The 2004–05 Tercera División was the fourth division in Spanish football.

Classification

Group I

Group II

Group III

Group IV

Group V

Group VI

Group VII

Group VIII

Group IX

Group X

Group XI

Grupo XII

Grupo XIII

Grupo XIV

Grupo XV Navarra

Grupo XV La Rioja

Group XVI

Group XVII

Notes

External links
Futbolme.com

 
Tercera División seasons
4
Spain